Sovetsky District is an administrative and municipal district (raion), one of the fifty-nine in Altai Krai, Russia. It is located in the southeast of the krai. Its administrative center is the rural locality (a selo) of Sovetskoye. Population:  The population of Sovetskoye accounts for 31.8% of the district's total population.

Geography
Sovetsky District is located on the south-central edge of Altai Krai, on the border with Altai Republic to the southeast.  The terrain is mostly peidmont forest-steppe, just west of the foothills of the Western Sayan Range of the Altai Mountains.  The Katun River forms the eastern and northern borders of the district, as it flows south-to-north to the Ob River to the north.  The Katun is typically frozen from December to early April.  

Sovetsky District is 195 km southeast of the city of Barnaul, and 3,000 km south of Moscow.  The area measures 40 km (north-south), and 45 km (west-east); total area is 1545 km2 (about 0.91% of Altai Krai).  The administrative center is the town of Sovetskoye.

The district is bordered on the north by Biysky District, on the east by Krasnogorsky District, on the south by Altaysky District, and on the west by Smolensky District.

References

Notes

Sources

External links
Sovetsky District on Google Maps
Sovetsky District on OpenStreetMap

Districts of Altai Krai